Ibrahim M. Kamel was an Egyptian wrestler who competed at the 1928 Summer Olympics.

References

External links
 

Year of birth missing
Possibly living people
Olympic wrestlers of Egypt
Wrestlers at the 1928 Summer Olympics
Egyptian male sport wrestlers
Place of birth missing
20th-century Egyptian people